is a Japanese manga series written and illustrated by Ryo Ikuemi. It was serialized in Shogakukan's seinen manga magazine Monthly Big Comic Spirits from August 2014 to April 2022, with its chapters collected in seven tankōbon volumes.

Publication
Written and illustrated by Ryo Ikuemi, Oyasumi Karasu, Mata Kite ne was serialized in Shogakukan's seinen manga magazine Monthly Big Comic Spirits from August 27, 2014, to April 27, 2022. Shogakukan collected its chapters in seven tankōbon volumes, released from June 10, 2016, to June 23, 2022.

Volume list

References

External links
 

Seinen manga
Shogakukan manga